Vasuki is the second king of the nagas in Hinduism. He is described as having a gem called Nagamani (serpent's ornament) on his head. Shesha, the first king of the nagas and the mount of Vishnu, is his elder brother, and Manasa, another naga, is his sister. In Hindu iconography, he is generally depicted coiling around the neck of Shiva, who is believed to have blessed and worn him as an ornament. 

He is known in Chinese and Japanese mythology as being one of the "eight Great Dragon Kings" (八大龍王 pinyin: Bādà lóngwáng; Japanese: Hachidai Ryūō),  amongst Nanda (Nāgarāja), Upananda, Sāgara (Shakara), Takshaka, Balavan, Anavatapta, and Utpala.

Legend
Vasuki is one of the sons of the sage Kashyapa and Kadru.

He is accorded a significant role in the legend of Samudra Manthana. He is described to have allowed both the devas and the asuras to bind him to Mount Mandara, so that they could use him as their churning rope to extract the amrita from the Ocean of Milk. 

In the Mahabharata, Vasuki is stated to have been cursed by Kadru. He refused to aid her in her scheme of hanging to the tail of the divine horse Ucchaishshravas with his other siblings to cause it to appear black, so that she could cheat in her wager against her sister Vinata. Condemned to burn with numerous brothers in King Janamejaya's snake sacrifice, he sought refuge with the devas, participating in the churning of the ocean.

Having retreated to the netherworld, but wishing to save his brothers from the snake sacrifice, Vasuki sought the counsel of his siblings. One of them, Elapatra, stated that he had overheard Brahma informing the other deities that the son born to their sister named Jaratkaru and a sage who shared the same name would be their saviour. Vasuki made the arrangements to marry his sister to the sage. The son born to them, Astika, was able to successfully put an end to Janamejaya's persecution of the nagas.

Buddhism 
In the Buddhist religion, Vasuki and the other Naga Kings appear in the audience for many of Gautama Buddha's sermons. The duties of the naga Kings included leading the nagas in protecting and worshipping the Buddha, as well as protecting other enlightened beings. Vasuki's naga priest is Tatig Naga.

Veneration
The Vāsuka/Vāsuca temple is located near Haripad, Mannarasala Illom in Kerala and the Visakha district in Andhra Pradesh. According to the regional legend of the Kukke Subramanya temple in Karnataka, the deity Kartikeya is regarded to have offered protection to Vasuki from the attack of Garuda, the mount of Vishnu.

See also

Snake worship
Manasa
Shesha

Bibliography

References

Nāgas